Aleksandr Viktorovich Kudryashov (born 3 August 1974) is a Russian professional football manager and a former player.

External links
 

1974 births
Footballers from Tambov
Living people
Russian footballers
Association football defenders
Russian Premier League players
Russian expatriate footballers
Expatriate footballers in Kazakhstan
FC Spartak Tambov players
FC Fakel Voronezh players
FC SKA Rostov-on-Don players
FC Kyzylzhar players
FC Metallurg Lipetsk players
FC Volgar Astrakhan players
Russian expatriate sportspeople in Kazakhstan
FC Sodovik Sterlitamak players
Russian football managers
FC Avangard Kursk players
FC Dynamo Bryansk players
FC Spartak-UGP Anapa players